The Hunter Region, also commonly known as the Hunter Valley, is a region of New South Wales, Australia, extending from approximately  to  north of Sydney. It contains the Hunter River and its tributaries with highland areas to the north and south. Situated at the northern end of the Sydney Basin bioregion, the Hunter Valley is one of the largest river valleys on the NSW coast, and is most commonly known for its wineries and coal industry.

Most of the population of the Hunter Region lives within  of the coast, with 55% of the entire population living in the cities of Newcastle and Lake Macquarie. There are numerous other towns and villages scattered across the region in the eleven local government areas (LGAs) that make up the region. At the  the combined population of the region was 682,465, and is expected to reach over 1,000,000 people by 2031. Under Australia's wine appellation system, the Hunter Valley wine zone Australian Geographical Indication (GI) covers the entire catchment of the Hunter River and its tributaries. Within that, the Hunter region is almost as large, and includes most of the wine-producing areas, excluding the metropolitan area of Newcastle and nearby coastal areas, some national parks, and any land that was in the Mudgee Shire (at the western heights of the catchment).

The Hunter wine region is one of Australia's best known wine regions, playing a pivotal role in the history of Australian wine as one of the first wine regions planted in the early 19th century. The success of the Hunter Valley wine industry has been dominated by its proximity to Sydney with its settlement and plantings in the 19th century fuelled by the trade network that linked the valley to the city. The steady demand of consumers from Sydney continues to drive much of the Hunter Valley wine industry, including a factor in the economy by the tourism industry. While the Hunter Valley has been supplanted by the massive Riverina wine region as the largest producer of New South Wales wine, it still accounts for around 3% of Australia's total wine production and is one of the country's most recognisable regions.

History 
For over 30,000 years the Wonnarua people of Aboriginal Australians inhabited the land that is now known as the Hunter Valley wine region. Along with the Worimi to the north and the Awabakal to the south, the Wonnarua developed a trading route connecting the Coquun (Hunter) Valley to the harbour now known as Sydney harbour.

The wine-making history of Hunter Valley begins with the European settlement of the Sydney and the New South Wales region of Australia in the late 18th century as a penal colony of the British Empire. The Hunter River itself was discovered, by accident, in 1797 by British Lieutenant John Shortland as he searched for escaped convicts. The region soon became a valuable source for timber and coal that fuelled the steamship trade coming out of Sydney.

Land prospector John Howe cut a path through the Australian wilderness from Sydney up to the overland area in what is now known as the (Lower) Hunter Valley proper in 1820. Today, the modern Putty Road between the cities of Windsor and Singleton follows Howe's exact path and is a major thoroughfare for wine tourists coming into the Hunter Valley from Sydney. As previous plantings in the coastal areas around Sydney succumbed to the humidity and wetness, and plantings to the west were limited by spring frost damage, northern reaches leading to the Hunter became, almost by default, the wine region of the new colony.

The expansive growth of the Hunter Valley in the mid to late 19th century came directly from its monopoly position of the lucrative Sydney market. The provincial government of New South Wales had enacted regulations that placed prohibitive duties on wines from other areas such as Victoria and South Australia. Following World War I, many returning Australian veterans were given land grants in the Hunter Valley. This temporarily produced an up-tick in plantings but the global Great Depression as well as a series of devastating hail storms between 1929 and 1930 caused many growers to abandon their vineyards.

Geography

Geology

The Hunter Region is considered a transitional area between the Paleozoic rock foundation of the New England Fold Belt located to the south and the Early Permian and Middle Triassic period rock formations of the Sydney Basin to the south. Between these two geological areas is the Hunter-Mooki Thrust fault. At one time this fault was very geologically active and gave rise to the Brokenback range that feature prominently in the Hunter region. Strips of basalt found throughout the region also bear witness to the volcanic activity that has occurred in the history of this fault.

The Permian rocks in the central and southeastern expanse of the Lower Hunter Valley were formed when the area was underneath a shallow marine estuary. The remnants of this period has left an extensive network of coal seams that fuelled the early population boom of the Hunter Valley in the 19th century as well a high degree of salinity in the water table of much of the area. The further north and west, towards the Brokenback Range and the Upper Hunter, the more Triassic sandstone that can be found leading eventually to the carboniferous rocks that form the northern boundary of the Hunter with the New England Fold Belt and the foothills of the Barrington Tops.

Overall, the Hunter Valley has more soils (mostly hard, acidic patches of poorly draining heavy clay) that are unsuitable for viticulture than they have areas that are ideal for growing grapes. The soils of the Lower Hunter vary widely from sandy alluvial flats (often planted to Semillon), to deep friable loam (often planted with Shiraz) and friable red duplex soils. In the Upper Hunter, the rivers and creeks of the region contribute to the areas black, silty loam soils that are often overlaid on top of alkaline clay loam. Among the hills of the Brokenback range are strips of volcanic basalt that are prized by growers for their tendencies to restrict vigor and concentrate mineral flavours in the grapes. The Warkworth Sands Woodland of the Hunter Valley are situated on these soils.

Rivers 
The main river in the region is the Hunter River, after which the region is named. Other rivers in the region include the Allyn, Avon, Barrington, Bow, Bowman, Chichester, Gloucester, Goulburn, Isis, Karuah, Krui, Mammy Johnsons, Merriwa, Munmurra, Pages, Paterson, Wangat and Williams rivers.

Despite being the area's namesake, the Hunter River itself is not the dominant feature of the region—falling behind the Brokenback Range for that distinction. The greater river system of the Hunter, which includes the Goulburn and important tributaries such as Giants Creek, do provide needed irrigation for areas such as the Upper Hunter than can be prone to drought condition. The origins of the river begin the Liverpool Range of the volcanic Barrington Tops and flows south and then east down to the Pacific Ocean at the seaport city of Newcastle.

Water supply 
Fresh water supply for the region is provided from a number of sources, which are managed by the Hunter Water and State Water Corporations. State Water Corporation's dams supply water for irrigation, industrial use at coal mines and the region's coal-fired power stations and town water to upper Hunter Region towns. Hunter Water Corporation's dams supply the large urban population of more than 500,000 living near the coast and centered on the cities of Newcastle and Lake Macquarie.

State Water Corporation's Glenbawn, the largest dam in the region, Chichester and Lostock are dams on the Hunter, Chichester and Paterson rivers respectively. Hunter Water Corporation's Grahamstown Dam, the largest dam supplying the urban areas of the lower Hunter Region, is supplied with water diverted from the Williams River just north of the Seaham Weir, through a large pump station at Balickera. The dam itself has only a small natural catchment and relies mainly on the pumped water from the Williams River. A proposal to build Tillegra Dam on the Williams River existed since the 1950s, but was scrapped in 2010. In addition to the dams, fresh water for the lower Hunter Region is supplied from the Tomago Sandbeds, via a series of bores.

Towns and cities 
The Hunter Region includes four cities. In order of population these are Lake Macquarie, Newcastle, Maitland and Cessnock. Newcastle, situated at the mouth of the Hunter River, is the second largest city in the region, although its immediate metropolitan area includes Lake Macquarie, and its statistical division also includes parts of the Maitland, Cessnock and Port Stephens areas. Other major centres of the Hunter Region are Dungog, Gloucester, Kurri Kurri, Muswellbrook, Raymond Terrace, Scone and Singleton.

Climate

The climate of Hunter Valley is humid subtropical, similar to the Greater Western Sydney region, with distinctive maritime influences from the Pacific Ocean. With its northerly latitude and close oceanic influences, the Hunter Valley is one of Australia's hottest and wettest wine regions. Flanked by mountains to the west and north the Hunter Valley acts as a funnel, pulling cool ocean breezes into the area. With those cooling breezes also comes heavy rainfall and periodic cyclonic storms in the summer and autumn months.

During the spring the Hunter Valley receives an average of 7.3–7.5 hours of sunshine a day.

Mid-latitude westerly winds bring high pressure weather front that alternate with cold fronts on the winter. This leads to generally drier conditions in the winter months of July and August. In the summer, southeasterly winds bring weather fronts harbouring extensive amounts of moisture. Between October and April more than two thirds of the region's annual rainfall will fall with January and February being the wettest months. Between the months of October–April, the 3pm average for relative humidity in the Lower Hunter is 49%, while it is 43% in the Upper Hunter.

Industries 
The main industries in the Hunter Region are coal mining, manufacturing, agriculture, viticulture and wine making, tourism, horse breeding, electricity production, dairy farming and beef cattle farming, and associated service industries. The Hunter Region is one of Australia's most famous wine-growing regions, known for both its red and white wine varieties.

Coal mining 
The most important economic activity in the valley is coal mining (through businesses such as Rio Tinto and BHP), mostly for export. The Port of Newcastle is the world's largest export facility for coal, most of which is brought to the port by rail. Coal ships are often seen off the coast of Newcastle.

Electricity generation 
Electricity generation at the Eraring, Bayswater, Liddell, Munmorah, Redbank and Vales Point coal-fired power stations is a major industry of the region.

Horse breeding 
The Hunter Valley is Australia's main region for the breeding and rearing of Thoroughbred horses and most of the country's best racehorses. The Upper Hunter area around Scone is one of the largest horse breeding areas in the world.

Tourism 
Commonly known as 'Wine Country', The Hunter Valley is a major tourist destination in New South Wales and is the 6th most visited place in Australia attracting more than 2.5 million people annually. There are regular events held in the Hunter for visitors, including the Hunter Valley Steam Trains running the first three Sundays of each month and regular scenic cruises on the Hunter River and Lake Macquarie.

Wine production 

The Hunter Valley Wine Zone Australian Geographical Indication was registered on 1 May 1996 and is approximately the entire Hunter River catchment. It contains only one named wine region, Hunter. The Hunter Wine Region Australian Geographical Indication was declared on 18 March 1997. It is not as large as the Hunter Valley zone, but includes most of the significant vineyards. It does not extend east of the Pacific Highway.

Some of the oldest vines in the Hunter Valley were planted in 1924 around the village of Fordwich. Pokolbin, located in the "Lower Hunter Valley", is the centre of the Hunter Valley wine country, which claims to be Australia's oldest wine region. The wine country is primarily located within the Cessnock and Singleton LGAs. Its proximity to Sydney has been an influence on the area's investments in wine production and its emergence as a tourist destination. The Broke Fordwich area is located along the Hunter River tributary of the Wollombi Brook near the suburb of Pokolbin and was founded in 1830 by Major Thomas Mitchell who named the region after his fellow Napoleonic War veteran Sir Charles Broke-Vere.

Much of the rolling countryside around Pokolbin is under vine and has a large number of vineyards, restaurants, shops, golf courses and country guesthouses. Other parts of the valley including the Wollombi Valley and Broke Fordwich subregion are also well known for wine, along with the Upper Hunter Valley. The main town in the Upper Hunter Valley subregion is Muswellbrook.

Administration

Political representation 
For the purposes of Australian federal elections for the House of Representatives, the Hunter Region is contained within the divisions of Hunter, Lyne, Newcastle, Paterson, and Shortland.

For the purposes of New South Wales elections for the Legislative Assembly, the Hunter Region is contained within the electoral districts of Cessnock, Charlestown, Lake Macquarie, Maitland, Myall Lakes, Newcastle, Port Stephens, Swansea, Upper Hunter, Wallsend, and Wyong.

Demography and area 
The following local government areas are contained within the region:

Environmental protection 
The Hunter Region contains the Goulburn River National Park, Myall Lakes National Park, Barrington Tops National Park, Werakata National Park, Watagans National Park, Mount Royal National Park, Polkolbin State Forest, Putty State Forest, Chichester State Forest, Running Creek Nature Reserve, The Glen Nature Reserve, Black Bulga State Conservation Area, Myall River State Forest, and Karuah Nature Reserve.

Within the Hunter, many endangered ecological communities (EECs) have been declared under the TSC Act. These communities are found on both public and private land, and prior to development of land, the landowner is required to undertake an environmental assessment to ascertain whether it will impact endangered species or endangered communities. Examples of endangered ecological communities found within the Hunter Region are:
 Grey Box-Grey Gum Wet Sclerophyll Forest
 Hunter Floodplain Red Gum Woodland
 Hunter Lowland Redgum Forest
 Hunter Valley Vine Thicket
 Hunter Valley Weeping Myall Woodland
 Lower Hunter Valley Dry Rainforest
 Warkworth Sands Woodland. This EEC occurs on aeolian sands, south east of Singleton (but may occur elsewhere in the Bioregion.)

Statehood movement 
There is an active movement campaigning for the Hunter Region to secede from New South Wales to form its own state. The sale of the Port of Newcastle and the refusal of the NSW state government to build a container terminal in Newcastle has been cited as the motivation behind the campaign. The movement's demands include a Royal commission into the feasibility of Hunter Valley Statehood as soon as possible, and a referendum on Hunter Valley statehood by 2030.

Chapter VI of the Constitution of Australia allows new states to be formed, but only with the consent of the Parliament of the state in question.

See also 
 New South Wales wine
 List of endangered ecological communities in NSW

Notes

References

External links 

 Hunter Valley Wine Tours
 Hunter Region Botanical Gardens

 
Wine regions of New South Wales
Valleys of Australia
Endangered ecological communities